The women's 100 metres event at the 2002 Commonwealth Games was held on 26–27 July.

Medalists

Results

Heats
Qualification: First 3 of each heat (Q) and the next 4 fastest (q) qualified for the semifinals.

Wind:Heat 1: –0.5 m/s, Heat 2: +0.5 m/s, Heat 3: –0.3 m/s, Heat 4: –1.1 m/s

Semifinals
Qualification: First 4 of each heat qualified directly (Q) for the final.

Wind:Heat 1: +0.3 m/s, Heat 2: +0.8 m/s

Final
Wind: +1.5 m/s

References
Official results
Results at BBC

100
2002
2002 in women's athletics